Kelvin Katey Carboo (10 March 2000) is a Ghanaian beach volleyball player.

Life 
Carboo hails from Accra in the Greater Accra Region of Ghana.

Career 
In July 2017, Carboo participated in the Commonwealth Youth Games with Eric Tsatsu as his partner and they were ranked 4th.

In July 2018, he participated in the 2018 Africa Youth Games held in Algeria. In October 2018, he again participated in the 2018 Youth Olympic Games.

In June 2019, he again participated in the 1st African Beach Games with Essilfie Samuel Tetteh as his partner and they were ranked 2nd. In August 2019, he participated in the 12th All African Games.

In January 2020, he participated in the CAVB Continental Cup held in Accra with Essilfie as his partner and they were ranked 1st.

In March 2022, he participated in the 1st African Beach Games held in Cape Verde.

References 

Living people
2000 births
Ghanaian beach volleyball players
People from Accra